Sanfilippodytes is a genus of beetles in the family Dytiscidae, containing the following species:

 Sanfilippodytes adelardi (Rochette, 1983)
 Sanfilippodytes barbarae (Fall, 1932)
 Sanfilippodytes barbarensis (Wallis, 1933)
 Sanfilippodytes belfragei (Sharp, 1882)
 Sanfilippodytes bertae Roughley & Larson, 2000
 Sanfilippodytes bidessoides (Leech, 1941)
 Sanfilippodytes brumalis (Brown, 1930)
 Sanfilippodytes compertus (Brown, 1932)
 Sanfilippodytes corvallis (Fall, 1923)
 Sanfilippodytes edwardsi (Wallis, 1933)
 Sanfilippodytes hardyi (Sharp, 1882)
 Sanfilippodytes kingii (Clark, 1862)
 Sanfilippodytes latebrosus (LeConte, 1852)
 Sanfilippodytes malkini (Hatch, 1951)
 Sanfilippodytes pacificus (Fall, 1923)
 Sanfilippodytes palliatus (Horn, 1883)
 Sanfilippodytes planiusculus (Fall, 1923)
 Sanfilippodytes pseudovilis (Young, 1953)
 Sanfilippodytes rossi (Leech, 1941)
 Sanfilippodytes sbordonii Franciscolo, 1979
 Sanfilippodytes setifer Roughley & Larson, 2000
 Sanfilippodytes terminalis (Sharp, 1882)
 Sanfilippodytes veronicae (Rochette, 1983)
 Sanfilippodytes vilis (LeConte, 1852)
 Sanfilippodytes williami (Rochette, 1986)

References

Dytiscidae genera